Reza Mirzaei (Persian: رضا میرزایی (born 14 April 1996) is an Iranian professional footballer who plays for Esteghlal in the Persian Gulf Pro League.

Club career statistics 

Last Update:7 september 2019

Honours 

 Sepahan 

 Persian Gulf Pro League (1) : 2014–15 ، runner-up 2020–21

 Esteghlal 

 Iranian Super Cup (1) :  2022

References
3. گل مهاجم سپاهان پنجمین گل لیگ قهرمانان آسیا شد Retrieved in Persian www.farsnews.ir

4. رضا میرزایی دوباره سپاهانی شد(عکس) Retrieved in Persian www.varzesh3.com 

5. میرزایی: با هواداران سپاهان قهر نیستم/ به نظر سرمربی تیم احترام می‌گذارم Retrieved in Persian www.tasnimnews.com 

6. رضا میرزایی در آستانه جدایی از سپاهان Retrieved in Persian www.ilna.news

External links 
 Reza Mirzaei at PersianLeague.com 
 
 
 

Sepahan S.C. footballers
1996 births
Living people
Iranian footballers
Association football wingers
Esteghlal F.C. players